Lev Sergeyevich Bayandin (2 January 1942 – 14 February 2018) was a Russian politician who served as the first Governor of Yamalo-Nenets Autonomous Okrug from 1991 until 1994.

Bayandin died on 14 February 2018, at the age of 76. He was survived by his wife, Vera Bayandina.

References

1942 births
2018 deaths
People from Cherdynsky District
Governors of Yamalo-Nenets Autonomous Okrug